Powellisetia bilirata is a species of marine gastropod mollusc in the family Rissoidae. First described by Winston Ponder in 1965, it is endemic to the waters of New Zealand.

Description

Powellisetia bilirata has a minute shell, with four whorls angled by a strongle spiral chord. The species is pale yellow-brown in colour, with a reddish-brown protoconch. The species measures 1.05mm, by 0.68mm.

Distribution

The species is endemic to New Zealand. The holotype was collected by K. Hipkins on 9 April 1955 from shell sand at McGregors Bay, Whangārei Heads, Northland Region. It is found in to the north-east of the North Island, as far north as Manawatāwhi / Three Kings Islands, and has been found neat the volcanic Whakaari / White Island.

References

Rissoidae
Gastropods described in 1965
Gastropods of New Zealand
Endemic fauna of New Zealand
Endemic molluscs of New Zealand
Molluscs of the Pacific Ocean
Taxa named by Winston Ponder